Peter Lai may refer to:

 Peter Lai (lyricist)
 Peter Lai Hing-ling (born 1951), Hong Kong politician